Urist is a surname. Notable people with the surname include:
Marshall R. Urist (1914–2001), American orthopedic surgeon
Sarah Urist Green (born c. 1979), American art museum curator and television host

See also 
Dwarf Fortress, a video game in which Urist is considered a generic Dwarf name.